Keli Malek (also Romanized as Kelī Malek) is a village in Dehdez Rural District, Dehdez District, Izeh County, Khuzestan Province, Iran. On the 2006 census, its population was 617, in 99 families.

References 

Populated places in Izeh County